Priscomilitaridae is a family of crustaceans belonging to the order Amphipoda.

Genera:
 Paraphotis Ren, 1997
 Priscomilitaris Hirayama, 1988

References

Corophiidea